Justice McRae or Justice MacRae may refer to:

Chuck McRae (born c. 1939), associate justice of the Supreme Court of Mississippi
George W. MacRae (1802–1858), associate justice of the Territorial Florida Supreme Court
James C. MacRae (1838–1909), associate justice of the North Carolina Supreme Court
Thomas Chipman McRae (1851–1929), special chief justice of the Arkansas Supreme Court

See also
Judge McRae (disambiguation)